Arzhan District is a district (bakhsh) in Shiraz County, Fars Province, Iran. At the 2006 census, its population was 23,166, in 5,006 families. The District has no cities, rather, it has three rural districts (dehestan): Dasht-e Arzhan Rural District, Kuh Mareh Sorkhi Rural District, and Qarah Chaman Rural District.

Wildlife 
There is an important ecological area here, that is Arzhan Protected Area.

References 

Shiraz County
Districts of Fars Province